The Deves Insurance Public Company Limited is a Thai insurance company based in Bangkok at Ratchadamnoen Klang Road.

The company is one of the leading insurance companies in the country. It received the royal warrant from the King of Thailand. The garuda statue at the top of headquarters symbolizes that privilege. It is owned by the Crown Property Bureau.

References

External links 

Homepage of Deves Insurance

Financial services companies established in 1947
Companies based in Bangkok
Thai Royal Warrant holders
Insurance companies of Thailand
Thai brands